The J.G. and Regina Long House, also known as Maple Grove Hill Farm, is a historic residence located southeast of Prairie City, Iowa, United States.  Joseph Grayson "Joe" Long was a native of Greene County, Pennsylvania.  He and his brother Jesse relocated to Jasper County, Iowa where they each bought extensive land holdings and farmed.  Joe had married Mary Bussey in Pennsylvania, but she died before he relocated to Iowa.  He married Regina Hiskey, a native of Richland County, Ohio.  They had two sons. Mental illness plagued the family.  Jesse committed suicide on his farm and Joe was institutionalized near the end of his life.  He died here in 1901, and Regina died here in 1925.  Their son Charles owned the farm from 1902 to 1934.  This Italianate style house was originally built just outside of the city limits of Monroe, Iowa.  The person who bought the property in 2012 didn't want the house so it was sold and relocated to a site similar to its historic rural setting in 2013, southeast of Prairie City.  The Iowa State Historic Preservation Office assisted with the move.  The two-story frame house follows an L-shaped plan.  It features a double and triple bracketed cornice, and a two-story porch in the ell of the house.  The house was listed on the National Register of Historic Places in 1997.

References

Italianate architecture in Iowa
Houses in Jasper County, Iowa
National Register of Historic Places in Jasper County, Iowa
Houses on the National Register of Historic Places in Iowa